Li Yinhui (born 11 March 1997) is a Chinese retired badminton player. She won the silver medal at the 2014 Asian Junior Championships in the girls' doubles event partnered with Du Yue. She and Du Yue then made it to the gold medal 2015. Together they won a silver medal at the 2015 BWF World Junior Championships after earning a bronze the previous year. At the 2018 BWF World Championships, Li took a bronze medal in the mixed doubles together with Zhang Nan.

Career 
Li competed at the 2020 Summer Olympics in Tokyo, Japan. Partnered with Du Yue, she finished in the quarter-finals after defeated by the eventual gold medalist Greysia Polii and Apriyani Rahayu of Indonesia in rubber games.

Li announced her retirement through her social media account. Chinese media reported that the women's doubles pair Li Yinhui and Du Yue world ranking were removed on 25 January 2022. Based on BWF interview, Li has a complication arising out of pneumonia, which, added to a genetic heart ailment, necessitated constant medication.

Achievements

BWF World Championships 
Women's doubles

Mixed doubles

Asian Championships 
Women's doubles

Mixed doubles

BWF World Junior Championships 
Girls' doubles

Asian Junior Championships 
Girls' doubles

BWF World Tour (3 titles, 5 runners-up) 
The BWF World Tour, which was announced on 19 March 2017 and implemented in 2018, is a series of elite badminton tournaments sanctioned by the Badminton World Federation (BWF). The BWF World Tour is divided into levels of World Tour Finals, Super 1000, Super 750, Super 500, Super 300 (part of the HSBC World Tour), and the BWF Tour Super 100.

Women's doubles

Mixed doubles

BWF Superseries (3 runners-up) 
The BWF Superseries, which was launched on 14 December 2006 and implemented in 2007, was a series of elite badminton tournaments, sanctioned by the Badminton World Federation (BWF). BWF Superseries levels were Superseries and Superseries Premier. A season of Superseries consisted of twelve tournaments around the world that had been introduced since 2011. Successful players were invited to the Superseries Finals, which were held at the end of each year.

Women's doubles

Mixed doubles

  BWF Superseries Premier tournament
  BWF Superseries tournament

BWF Grand Prix (5 titles, 2 runners-up)
The BWF Grand Prix had two levels, the Grand Prix and Grand Prix Gold. It was a series of badminton tournaments sanctioned by the Badminton World Federation (BWF) and played between 2007 and 2017.

Women's doubles

Mixed doubles

  BWF Grand Prix Gold tournament
  BWF Grand Prix tournament

References

External links

1997 births
Living people
Badminton players from Wuhan
Chinese female badminton players
Badminton players at the 2020 Summer Olympics
Olympic badminton players of China